Sonia is a 1921 silent British drama film directed by Denison Clift and starring Evelyn Brent, based on the 1917 novel Sonia: Between Two Worlds by Stephen McKenna.  The film is considered to be lost.

Cast
 Evelyn Brent as Sonia Dainton
 Clive Brook as David O'Raine
 Cyril Raymond as Tom Dainton
 Olaf Hytten as Fatty Webster
 Henry Vibart as Reverend Burgess
 M. Gray Murray as Sir Roger Dainton
 Hetta Bartlett as Lady Dainton
 Leo Stormont as Sir Adolph Erckmann
 Gladys Hamilton as Lady Erckmann
 George Travers as Lord Loring
 Julie Hartley-Milburn as Lady Loring

References

External links

1921 films
1921 drama films
1921 lost films
British drama films
British silent feature films
British black-and-white films
Films directed by Denison Clift
Lost British films
Films based on British novels
Ideal Film Company films
Lost drama films
1920s British films
Silent drama films